The General Certificate of Education (GCE) Ordinary Level, also called the O-level or O level, was a subject-based academic qualification. Introduced in 1951 as a replacement for the 16+ School Certificate (SC), the O-level would act as a pathway to the new, more in-depth and academically rigorous A-level (Advanced Level), in England, Wales and Northern Ireland. Later, the complementary and more vocational Certificate of Secondary Education (CSE) was added to broaden the subjects available and offer qualifications in non-academic subjects.

The O-Level and CSE were replaced in the United Kingdom in 1988 by the GCSE and later complementary IGCSE exams. The Scottish equivalent was the O-grade (replaced, following a separate process, by the Standard Grade). An O-level branded qualification is still awarded by Cambridge International Examinations in select locations.

Structure
O-levels were predominantly exam-based; this had advantages for students in part-time or evening education. Some commentators criticised this mainly exam-based approach as offering only partial proof of the student's overall ability in comparison with other methods (e.g., coursework-based assessment). There was no summative 'school certificate': each subject was a separate O-level in its own right.

Madsen Pirie argued that the O-level was unfairly biased to boys because of the emphasis on exam-based learning, and therefore girls were placed at a disadvantage. Pirie also observes that the GCSE focus on coursework has now disadvantaged boys, and has reversed the gender gap in attainment to the level where, in all subjects, girls outperform boys.

Grading
Until 1975, candidates were awarded only a pass or fail classification. Although candidates received an approximate indication of the marks awarded, O-Level Certificates simply listed those subjects in which a pass had been awarded; subjects in which a candidate had failed were not mentioned. The independent exam boards soon offered competing numeric and alphabetic classifications, for example 1, 2, 3, 4, 5 and 6 would be a pass, while grades 7, 8 and 9 were fails from the JMB.  From 1975 standardized alphabetic grades where introduced with grades A, B, C, D, and E were passes, and F and U (Unclassified) were fails. Between 1975 and 1985 grades were allocated primarily on a norm-referenced basis, assigning a fixed proportion of each cohort to each grade (A 10%, B 15%, C 25–30%, D 5–10%, E 5–10%, U 15–20%). Though some exceptions existed, both at the subject and Exam Board level, with Latin and Greek pass rates being consistently higher than other subjects, with 75.4% passing in 1976, in contrast to an average 59% pass rate across all subjects e.g. Biology 56.4%, History 57%. The pass rate and top awards by the Oxford & Cambridge board were also consistently higher than the other boards e.g. In 1976, 27% of Latin entrants gained an A, and ~17% of French, German and Music candidates, this was attributed to the O&C board being primarily used by the Independent schools. The proportion obtaining a pass, A-D, or equivalent was initially fixed at 57% – 58%, and remained under 60% through the 1970s, though there was regional variation with Northern Ireland awarding consistently more pass grades than Wales e.g. In 1982, the pass rates were: Northern Ireland 62%, England 58% Wales 53%. In 1984 a decision was taken, by the Secondary Examinations Council, to replace the norm referencing with criteria referencing, where 16+ and 18+ grades would in future be awarded on Examiner Judgement, this change was implemented, at O-Level, in June 1986. In the final year DES statistics were available 6.8% achieved an A, and 39.8% an A-C grade.

O-levels incorporate an element of negative marking, with marks deducted for incorrect answers, poor spelling, grammar or handwriting.

The table below gives rough equivalences between O-Level, CSE, and GCSE grades, including later changes to GCSE grades in 1994 and the 2010s:

NB The current grade 9 is HIGHER than the previous A* grade was and hence has no equivalent.

For GCSE Mathematics from 1988 there was an extension paper allowing candidates to achieve 3 grades higher than an A (pass, merit, and distinction). This was stopped.

Entrants
The 1978 Waddell Report, when comparing O-Level and CSE entrants stated: "the O Level examination tending to be aimed at the upper 20 per cent of the full ability range and CSE catering for the next 40 per cent." This conclusion is partially supported by the statistics. After 1976, for subjects where an equivalent O-level paper existed, approximately 36% of the pupils entered for either exam sat the O-Level; the remainder (64%) sat the CSE paper. The proportion taking CSE exams increased following the raising of the minimum school-leaving age to 16, in 1973, and the subsequent fall in the proportion sitting neither exam e.g.

Exam boards
The O-Level syllabi, examinations and awards were made by 9 independent boards: Associated Examining Board, Durham University Examinations Board (dissolved 1964), Joint Matriculation Board, Oxford and Cambridge, Oxford, Southern, Cambridge, London, and Welsh Joint Education Committee.

Unlike CSE examinations the participating schools had a choice of syllabi and awarding body, and were not required to use a designated local board.

Later developments
The O-level qualifications in England, Wales and Northern Ireland were replaced by the General Certificate of Secondary Education (GCSE), phased in by 1986 with a couple of subjects, and completed for all subjects the following year. However, the O-level brand is still used in many Commonwealth countries, such as Bangladesh, Mauritius, Sri Lanka, and Singapore, instead of or alongside the IGCSE qualifications. The Hong Kong Certificate of Education Examination was also benchmarked against the O-levels for comparable subjects. But it has switched to benchmark against the IGCSE. The School Certificate of Mauritius continues to use the O-level exams.

O-levels continue to thrive as well respected international qualifications for students in other countries, who use them for preparation for advanced study in their own country and/or access higher education overseas. Approximately 12 million candidates from more than 200 countries register annually for O-level examinations across the world. Institutions that offer O-levels include Cambridge International Examinations (CIE).

Cambridge International Examinations offers curricula for approximately 40 different subjects.

See also 

 Certificate of Secondary Education (CSE)
 General Certificate of Education (GCE), which comprises O Levels and A levels
 GCE Ordinary Level (International) (O Level), for the use of O Levels in other countries
 GCE Advanced Level (A Level)
 General Certificate of Secondary Education (GCSE), which replaced the O Levels and CSE
 School Certificate predecessor to the GCE O Level and CSE qualifications

References 

Educational qualifications in the United Kingdom
Secondary school qualifications
1951 establishments in England